Biondolillo is a surname. Notable people with the surname include:

Gaspere Biondolillo, later known as Jack La Rue, (1902–1984), American actor
Jack Biondolillo (born 1940), American bowler